LIM domain transcription factor LMO4 is a protein that in humans is encoded by the LMO4 gene.

LIM domain only 4 is a cysteine-rich, two LIM domain-containing protein that may play a role as a transcriptional regulator or possibly an oncogene.  Its mRNA is characterized by a GC-rich 5' region and by multiple ATTT motifs in the 3' region.  A variant transcript missing a portion of the 5' region has been identified but cannot be confirmed because of the GC-rich nature of the region.

Interactions
LMO4 has been shown to interact with LDB1, RBBP8 and BRCA1.

References

Further reading